Leroy Hugh Watson (November 3, 1893 – February 12, 1975) was a career officer in the United States Army who attained the rank of major general. A 1915 graduate of the United States Military Academy ("The class the stars fell on"), Watson served in the Pancho Villa Expedition and World War I.

During World War II, Watson commanded the 3rd Armored Division from August 1942 to August 1944. Concerned that he was not leading the division effectively during combat in France, his superior, Omar Bradley, a West Point classmate and lifelong friend, relieved him of duty. Rather than request a stateside assignment that would allow him to keep his temporary rank, Watson agreed to accept a reduction in rank in order to remain in France.  Watson was reduced in rank to colonel and assigned to the staff of Bradley's Twelfth United States Army Group. Soon afterwards, Brigadier General Norman Cota was transferred from assignment as assistant division commander of the 29th Infantry Division to commander of the 28th Infantry Division and promoted to major general. Watson was selected to replace Cota at the 29th Infantry Division. In November 1944, he was again promoted to brigadier general, reclaiming general officer's rank less than three months after his demotion. In August 1945, Watson was appointed to command the 79th Infantry Division, which he led until it was inactivated in December 1945.

Following the war, Watson served as commander of the International Military Tribunal Command in Germany, where he worked to enhance security and ensure that none of the Nazis on trial for war crimes were able to escape. His later assignments included chief of Civil Affairs for the U.S. Far East Command and commander of US Defense Advisory Group, Japan. In early 1953 he was promoted to major general, and he retired later that year.

After retiring, Watson lived in Beverly Hills, California, where he served on the city council and was mayor from 1962 to 1963. He died in Beverly Hills on February 12, 1975, and was buried at West Point Cemetery.

Early life

Leroy H. Watson was born in St. Louis, Missouri on November 3, 1893, the son of furrier George Washington Watson and Sarah Ann (Callahan) Watson. He attended the public schools of St. Louis and was a 1910 graduate of McKinley High School.

Watson received appointment to the United States Military Academy in 1911. He graduated in 1915, a member of "The class the stars fell on", and was ranked 151st of 164.  Watson was appointed a second lieutenant of Infantry and initially assigned to border security with the 22nd Infantry Regiment at Camp Harry J. Jones, Arizona during the Pancho Villa Expedition. He was soon transferred to the 11th Infantry and promoted to first lieutenant. He received his promotion to captain in May 1917.

World War I
In June 1917, Watson was transferred to the 51st Infantry, a unit of the 6th Division. He served as regimental exchange officer and regimental adjutant before commanding a battalion, and briefly commanded the regiment during the first week of November.

The 51st Infantry arrived in France in June 1918, and Watson was promoted to major in July. He was the regimental adjutant for most of the war, and took part in combat from August until its end in November, including the Meuse-Argonne Offensive, earning his first award of the Silver Star. After the Armistice, Watson remained in Germany as part of the Army of Occupation. He returned to the United States in June 1919 and demobilized with his regiment at Camp Grant, Illinois, on June 19.

Post-World War I
After his regiment was demobilized, Watson remained at Camp Grant and served as a recruiting officer. He graduated from the Infantry School's course for field grade officers in 1921. After graduating, Watson was retained at the Infantry School as an instructor, where he remained until 1925. In 1922 he was reduced to his permanent rank of captain, and he was promoted to major again in September 1925.

In October 1925, Watson arrived for duty in the Panama Canal Zone, and he successively commanded 3rd Battalion, 42nd Infantry (1925-1927), and 3rd Battalion, 33rd Infantry (1927-1928). In 1928, Watson returned to the United States to become a student at the Command and General Staff College. He graduated in 1930 and remained at the college to serve as an instructor.

In 1934, Watson graduated from the Chemical Warfare School's course for field grade officers, and he was also a 1934 graduate of the United States Army War College. Later that year he was posted to Fort McPherson, Georgia. In 1936 Watson received assignment to the Army general staff in Washington. In 1937 he was promoted to lieutenant colonel. In 1940 he was assigned to the staff of the Philippine Department.

World War II

At the start of World War II, Watson completed the Tank Officer's Course and was assigned as executive officer of the 66th Armor Regiment. He was promoted to colonel in 1941 and assigned to command 40th Armored Regiment, 3rd Armored Brigade. When the Army reorganized its armor forces into divisions in February 1942, it created three brigade-level Combat Commands in each. Originally named 1st, 2nd, and 3rd Combat Commands, these organizations were later re-designated Combat Commands A, B, and R (Reserve). When the 3rd Armored Division was fielded in 1942, Watson was named commander of the division's 1st Combat Command (Combat Command A) and promoted to brigadier general.

In August 1942, Watson was named commander of the 3rd Armored Division and promoted to major general. After completing its organization and training in Louisiana, California, and Pennsylvania, the organization arrived in Somerset, England in June 1943, where it continued to train.

Watson led 3rd Armored Division during combat in France beginning in late June 1944 as part of First United States Army. Unhappy with the division's progress in Normandy, in early August 1944, VII Corps commander J. Lawton Collins decided to relieve Watson of command. Collins’ superior, Omar Bradley, a West Point classmate of Watson's, initially disagreed with Collins, but ultimately decided to concur with Collins’ decision. Watson was replaced by Maurice Rose.

When Watson was relieved of command, he requested to remain in the area of combat operations in France at any rank rather than return to the United States in a training or administrative role with a general's rank. Impressed by Watson's request, Bradley informed his superior Dwight Eisenhower (another of Watson's West Point classmates) at Supreme Headquarters Allied Expeditionary Force (SHAEF), and they agreed to retain Watson in France. He was reduced in rank to colonel and assigned to Bradley's staff at Twelfth United States Army Group Headquarters.

On August 14, Norman Cota, the assistant division commander of the 29th Infantry Division, was promoted to major general and assigned to command the 28th Infantry Division. After considering possible replacements for Cota, Bradley and Eisenhower decided on Watson. (The 29th Division fell under XIX Corps, not VII Corps, which meant the 29th's leaders would not report to Collins, a circumstance that likely factored into Bradley and Eisenhower's decision.) Watson served with the 29th Division during combat in France and Germany throughout the rest of 1944 and early 1945. In December 1944, he was promoted to brigadier general. In August 1945, Watson was appointed to command the 79th Infantry Division, which he led during post-war occupation duty in Germany until it was inactivated in December 1945.

Post-World War II
Following the war, Watson served as commander of the International Military Tribunal Command in Germany, where he worked to enhance security and ensure that none of the Nazis on trial for war crimes were able to escape. His later assignments included command of Sixth United States Army's Southern District, command of Fort Lewis in Washington state, chief of Civil Affairs for the U.S. Far East Command, and commander of US Defense Advisory Group, Japan. In early 1953 he was promoted to major general, and he retired later that year.

Civilian career
After retiring from the Army, Watson resided in Beverly Hills, California, and was appointed assistant to the president of Fletcher Aviation, with responsibility for providing oversight, advice and guidance for Fletcher's military aviation projects and programs. He was subsequently promoted to vice president and retired from Fletcher following a 1961 heart attack.

A Republican, Watson also served for eight years on the Beverly Hills City Council beginning in 1960. From 1962 to 1963 he served as mayor after being elected by a vote of his peers on the council.

In 1965, Dwight Eisenhower authored a Reader's Digest article on leadership, and cited Watson's relief as commander of the 3rd Armored Division and request to remain in France at a lower rank as a notable example of selfless service. In an interview about the article, Watson began to object to the way Eisenhower had characterized his pre-relief performance, but then stopped himself and told the reporter that most of the details in Eisenhower's article were correct, and there was no point in arguing about the rest.

In retirement, Watson was also active with the Winsor Memorial Heart Research Foundation of Los Angeles. The foundation worked with him on the "Watson Project," a procedure Watson devised for clearing obstructed blood vessels.

Death and burial
Watson died in Beverly Hills on February 12, 1975. He was buried at West Point Cemetery on February 19, 1975.

Awards
Watson's military awards included:

Silver Star with oak leaf cluster
Legion of Merit with oak leaf cluster
Bronze Star Medal with two oak leaf clusters
Army Commendation Medal with oak leaf cluster
Mexican Border Service Medal
World War I Victory Medal with two campaign clasps
Army of Occupation of Germany Medal
American Defense Service Medal
American Campaign Medal
European-African-Middle Eastern Campaign Medal with two campaign stars
World War II Victory Medal
Army of Occupation Medal with "Germany" clasp
National Defense Service Medal
Legion of Honor (France)
Croix de Guerre (France)
Order of the White Lion, 3rd Class (Czechoslovakia)

Family
Watson was married four times. In 1915, he married Alice Virginia Furey (1896–1942). They were the parents of four children - Sarah (Sally, a nun in the Sisters of Charity) (1916–2005), Leroy Jr. (1917–1959), Margaret (Peggy) (1921–2013), and Robert (1933–1990).

In 1943, Watson married Elizabeth Livingston (1891–1958), and they divorced at the end of World War II. While stationed in Germany after the war in 1946, he married Liba J. Besin (1923–1949), a native of Czechoslovakia and former translator at the Nuremberg trials, with whom he had a daughter, Antoinette. In 1950, he married Beulah Beatrice (Beggs) Pellekaan (1890–1990) of Beverly Hills, the widow of a Shell Oil Company executive.

Notes

References

Sources

Newspapers

Books

Internet

Magazines

External links

Generals of World War II

|-

|-

|-

1893 births
1975 deaths
United States Military Academy alumni
Military personnel from St. Louis
United States Army Infantry Branch personnel
United States Army personnel of World War I
Recipients of the Silver Star
United States Army Command and General Staff College alumni
United States Army Command and General Staff College faculty
United States Army War College alumni
United States Army generals of World War II
Recipients of the Legion of Merit
United States Army generals
Military personnel from California
California Republicans
Mayors of Beverly Hills, California
Burials at West Point Cemetery